"Blue Skies" is a popular song, written by Irving Berlin in 1926.

"Blue Skies" is one of many popular songs whose lyrics use a "bluebird of happiness" as a symbol of cheer: "Bluebirds singing a song/Nothing but bluebirds all day long." The sunny optimism of the lyrics are undercut by the minor key giving the words an ironic feeling.

History
The song was composed in 1926 as a last-minute addition to the Rodgers and Hart musical Betsy. Although the show ran for only 39 performances, "Blue Skies" was an instant success, with audiences on opening night demanding 24 encores of the piece from star Belle Baker. During the final repetition, Ms. Baker forgot her lyrics, prompting Berlin to sing them from his seat in the front row.

In 1927, the music was published and Ben Selvin's recorded version (as The Knickerbockers with vocals by Charles Kaley) was a hit. That same year, it became one of the first songs to be featured in a talkie, when Al Jolson performed it in The Jazz Singer.  The song was recorded for all of the major and dime store labels of the time. A version was recorded by Benny Goodman and his Orchestra in 1935 (Victor 25136). 1946 was also a notable year for the song, with a Bing Crosby/Fred Astaire film taking its title along with two recorded versions by Count Basie and Benny Goodman reaching #8 and #9 on the pop charts, respectively.

Thelonious Monk's 1947 composition "In Walked Bud" is based on the chord changes to "Blue Skies."

Bing Crosby and Danny Kaye performed the song in the 1954 seasonally perennial film, White Christmas.

In 1958, Ella Fitzgerald crossed genres putting her own distinctive scat jazz stylings on "Blue Skies" for her double-LP album, Ella Fitzgerald Sings the Irving Berlin Song Book, that year's installment in her famous eight-album Song Book series. The track was also included in that year's Ella compilation album, Get Happy!.

The song was featured prominently in the film Star Trek: Nemesis, as sung by Commander Data during the wedding at the start of the film. It is sung again at the very end of the film by his "brother," the android B-4, during the final scene set in the 24th century, a time period not revisited by the Star Trek franchise for another 18 years, until the release of Star Trek: Picard in 2020. The song "Blue Skies" is featured in that series' premiere episode during a dream sequence involving Data and Captain Picard. The song receives a cover by lead actress Isa Briones for the 10th episode when Data's "spirit" dies.

The song was featured in Ann Marie Fleming's 2002 short film Blue Skies, performed by Alessandro Juliani.

Lyrics 
Blue skies, smilin' at me
Nothin' but blues skies do I see

Bluebirds singing a song
Nothin' but bluebirds all day long

Never saw the sun shinin' so bright
Never saw things lookin' so right
Noticin' the days hurryin' by
When you're in love, my how they fly

Blue days, all of them gone
Nothin' but blue skies from now on

Never saw the sun shinin' so bright
Never saw things lookin' so right
Noticin' the days hurryin' by
When you're in love, oh how they fly

Blue days, all of them gone
Nothin' but blue skies from now on

Willie Nelson cover
Twenty years after Fitzergald's cover, in 1978, Willie Nelson released another version of "Blue Skies" which became a #1 country music hit. This version hearkened back to 1939 when it was a major western swing and country standard, performed by Moon Mullican.

Chart performance

See also
List of 1920s jazz standards

Notes

External links
Betsy 1926
Irving Berlin’s Music in Films
Time article on Irving Berlin
An early electronic performance of "Blue Skies" realized on the RCA Mark II Electronic Sound Synthesizer
 

1926 songs
1920s jazz standards
1978 singles
Songs written by Irving Berlin
Belle Baker songs
Bing Crosby songs
Benny Goodman songs
Willie Nelson songs
Whispering Jack Smith songs
Rosemary Clooney songs
Columbia Records singles
Eva Cassidy songs
Pop standards